Ravindra Dastikop (born May 24, 1964) is an educator and speaker on Cloud Computing. He is currently serving as an Assistant Professor, Department of Computer Science and Engineering, SDM College of Engineering and Technology in Dharwad, Karnataka where he began his career in 1987. He is also the director of Centre for Web Enabled Learning (C-WEL).

Early life and education 
Ravindra Dastikop had earlier education in Belgaum, Mandya and Mysore and completed his graduation in science and postgraduate diploma in computer applications from Sri Jayachamarajendra College of Engineering, Mysore in 1986. Later he pursued in engineering degree, post graduation and further qualifications from Birla Institute of Technology and Science.

Computer science career
Currently his teaching interests are around cloud computing and social media. He offers a semester long course- Introduction to Cloud Computing for all branches of engineering. He is planning to offer Designing Cloud Computing System course for CSE students from upcoming semester. During 2004, he visited Tribhuvan University, Kathmandu, Nepal as a visiting faculty and taught a course in Programming Languages. In the same year, he was invited to be adjunct faculty at International Institute of Information Technology, Bangalore.

During 2004, he spent a sabbatical at Infosys, Bangalore where he studied the knowledge Management systems for 8  weeks. Being part of many conferences he has taken up different roles of paper presenter, chairing a session, reviewing the paper and more. Some of major conference that he is actively involved/involving include  IEEE Technology for Education, ACM SIGIR 2008, ESSIR 2007.

Roles
He has taken up many organizational roles- Faculty Incharge, IPR cell and Placement Officer. As IPR cell in charge he conducted two workshops for the management and decision makers in technical education. He was also part of the team that designed IPR curriculum under Autonomous scheme.

Independent works
MVS
PGDCA
ESSIR on Information Retrieval, Glasgow, 2007

Awards 
2009 Best Teacher at SDM College of Engineering and Technology
2009 Marquis Who is who in Science & Technology Marquis Who's Who

References 
 The Nature of the Cyber Firm: Contextual Model of Business for Cyber World

External links 
 Website
 Blog:Cloud Computing for All Walks of Life
 Marquis Who is who

 
 YouTube Talk
 Silicon India Interview

1964 births
Living people